Westlake is a city in Cuyahoga County, Ohio, United States. It is a suburb of Cleveland located 12 miles west of downtown Cleveland. The population was 34,228 at the 2020 census.

Geography
Westlake is located at  (41.454439, −81.928657).

Demographics

Income
The median income for a household in the city was $92,917, and the median income for a family was $81,223 (these figures had changed to $63,252 and $90,397 respectively as of a 2007 estimate). Males had a median income of $60,429 versus $36,999 for females. The per capita income for the city was $56,515. About 1.3% of families and 2.5% of the population were below the poverty line, including 1.7% of those under age 18 and 2.8% of those age 65 or over. Of the city's population over the age of 25, 50.1% hold a bachelor's degree or higher, while 81.3% spoke English, 1.62% Arabic, 1.5% Spanish, 1.3% Greek, and 0.7% German and Chinese.

2010 census
As of the census of 2010, there were 32,729 people, 13,870 households, and 8,443 families living in the city. The racial makeup of the city was 91.2% White, 1.6% African American, 0.1% Native American, 4.9% Asian, 0.1% Pacific Islander, 0.6% from other races, and 1.6% from two or more races. Hispanic or Latino people of any race were 2.5% of the population.

There were 13,870 households, of which 26.2% had children under the age of 18 living with them, 51.4% were married couples living together, 6.9% had a female householder with no husband present, 2.5% had a male householder with no wife present, and 39.1% were non-families. Of all households 34.2% were made up of individuals, and 13.2% had someone living alone who was 65 years of age or older. The average household size was 2.30 and the average family size was 3.01.

The median age in the city was 45 years. Of the residents 21.5% were under the age of 18; 5.7% were between the ages of 18 and 24; 22.8% were from 25 to 44; 31% were from 45 to 64; and 19% were 65 years of age or older. The gender makeup of the city was 47.4% male and 52.6% female.

2000 census
As of the census of 2000, there were 31,760 people, 12,830 households, and 8,186 families living in the city. The population density was 1,995.2 people per square mile (770.2/km). There were 13,648 housing units at an average density of 858.5 per square mile (331.4/km). The racial makeup of the city was 91.65% White, 0.95% African American, 1.36% Native American, 4.21% Asian, 0.01% Pacific Islander, 0.33% from other races, and 1.51% from two or more races. Hispanic or Latino people of any race were 1.27% of the population.

There were 12,826 households, out of which 28.5% had children under the age of 18 living with them, 55.9% were married couples living together, 5.8% had a female householder with no husband present, and 36.1% were non-families. Of all households 32.0% were made up of individuals, and 12.7% had someone living alone who was 65 years of age or older. The average household size was 2.37 and the average family size was 3.06.

In the city, the population was spread out, with 22.8% under the age of 18, 5.6% from 18 to 24, 26.8% from 25 to 44, 26.6% from 45 to 54, and 18.2% who were 55 years of age or older. The median age was 42 years. For every 100 females, there were 89.4 males. For every 100 females age 18 and over, there were 85.3 males.

History
The area now known as the city of Westlake was first settled on October 10, 1810. At the time, it was part of Dover Township.

In 1901, the northern part of the township seceded to form Bay Village. In 1912, a southern portion left to join North Olmsted.  The remaining township residents formed Dover Village in 1913, taking with it a portion of Olmsted Township.

In order to avoid confusion with the city of Dover in Tuscarawas County, Dover Village was renamed Westlake in 1940. The village of Westlake became a city in 1957.

In September 1966, a house in Westlake which had recently been bought by John R. Compton, a black pastor, was firebombed. No one was injured, although the bombing did cause around $10,000 of damage. According to the Cleveland Press, the mayor of Westlake, Alexander R. Roman, "criticized the parties involved in the sale of the home... He said no one was notified so the community could be prepared to accept a Negro family."

Economy
Companies headquartered in Westlake include Nordson, American Greetings, Hyland Software, and Scott Fetzer Company, TravelCenters of America, and Equity Trust.

Top employers
According to the city's 2021 Comprehensive Annual Financial Report, the top employers in the city are:

Schools 
The Westlake City School District consistently places within the top 4% of statewide districts on the state education report card. The district received an achievement grade of 89.0% for the Performance Index and a grade of 95.% for the Indicators Met on the Ohio Department of Education's 2013-2014 District Report Card.

The district mission statement is "We Educate for Excellence."

 Westlake Elementary School (grades K-4), a new elementary school designed to replace the existing four set to open in the 2019–2020 school year
 Dover Intermediate School (grades 5–6)
 Lee Burneson Middle School (grades 7–8)
 Westlake High School (grades 9–12)

Westlake High School is home to WHBS-TV, the Westlake High school Broadcasting System. WHBS-TV is seen on channels 99 and 18 on AT&T U-Verse and WOW! cable, respectively, in the Westlake area.

Points of interest

 Westlake is served by the Westlake Porter Public Library.
 Also found in Westlake is Lakewood Country Club, "the only Northern Ohio Club to host the PGA-based, Web.com televised golf tour." 
 Clague House Museum showcases the history of Westlake (formerly Dover). This house was built in 1876.
 Clague Playhouse is a community theatre producing five plays a season from the classic and contemporary repertoire.
 The White Oaks Restaurant was a lucrative speakeasy during the Prohibition era.
 Dover Gardens Tavern was also a speakeasy with an upstairs ballroom during Prohibition.

Crocker Park

Crocker Park is a lifestyle center located on Crocker Road. It is essentially an outdoor mall with areas for recreation and socializing. The park is based on a small French town-type setting. There are also apartments and offices above some stores and restaurants. Townhouses are located on the southwest corner.

Notable people

Jason Kelce, American football player
Travis Kelce, American football player
Jake Paul, YouTuber and boxer
Logan Paul, YouTuber and actor
Brian K. Vaughan, comics and television writer

Sister cities

Westlake's first sister city partnership with the Town of Tralee in Ireland was founded in 2009 and is recognized by Sister Cities International. In 2012 Westlake also became sister city to the Canadian town of Kingsville, Ontario.
  Tralee, County Kerry, Ireland
 Kingsville, Ontario, Canada

References

External links

 City of Westlake - homepage
 Westlake Historical Society

1811 establishments in Ohio
Cities in Ohio
Cities in Cuyahoga County, Ohio
Cleveland metropolitan area
Populated places established in 1811